The Charlestown Ropewalk is a former ropewalk facility located in Charlestown, Massachusetts at the former Boston Navy Yard. It is currently under study as a pending Boston Landmark by the Boston Landmarks Commission.

The ropewalk building was constructed between 1834 and 1838. It was designed by Alexander Parris, who also designed much of the rest of the Charlestown Navy Yard, and other landmarks throughout Massachusetts. From its opening in 1838 until its closing in 1970, it made most of the cordage used by the United States Navy. When the Navy Yard was closed in 1973, the building was acquired by the Boston Redevelopment Authority.

Since its closure in the 1970s, the building has mostly sat empty. In recent years, developers have made plans to turn the ropewalk into apartments. As of December 2018, plans have been approved, but no construction has started until 2019. A Philadelphia firm, Vision Properties, has teamed up with the Frontier Enterprises to renovate this historic building into 97 residential apartment units. Of the 97 units, approximately 20 units will be affordable housing units. Renovations has begun and is expected to be completed by the end of 2019. Apartment types will include studios, one and two bedrooms. Leasing activities has begun as well. There is a 3,000 sf commercial unit for lease. The Parks Service will also have a museum of artifacts from the Rope company within the building. .

References

External links
Map of the yard, showing the ropewalk
Developer proposing reuse of structure, with talk about previous structure redevelopment plans
1858 woodcut of the building
1950's film showing the ropewalk in use

Charlestown, Boston
Landmarks in Charlestown, Boston
Ropewalks